Héctor Ricardo (10 February 1925 – 6 September 1989) was an Argentine footballer. He played in seven matches for the Argentina national football team in 1945. He was also part of Argentina's squad for the 1945 South American Championship.

References

External links
 
 

1925 births
1989 deaths
Argentine footballers
Argentina international footballers
Place of birth missing
Association football goalkeepers
Rosario Central footballers
Racing Club de Avellaneda footballers
Club Atlético Huracán footballers
Boca Juniors footballers
Rampla Juniors players
Argentine expatriate footballers
Expatriate footballers in Uruguay